Friends' Central School (FCS) is a Quaker school which educates students from nursery through grade 12. It is located in Wynnewood, a community in Lower Merion Township, Pennsylvania in Greater Philadelphia.

The school was founded in 1845 in Philadelphia, near the current location of the Philadelphia Mint. It had an enrollment of 769 students from nursery to grade 12 in 2019.

Informally known as "Friends' Central," the school encompasses three divisions: Lower School (nursery through 5th grades), Middle School (6th through 8th), and Upper School (9th through 12th). The Middle and Upper Schools share their campus, and the Lower School occupies its own site.

The school is widely known for the quality of its education, consistently as one of the top schools in the Philadelphia area.

History
Friends' Central School was founded in 1845 in Philadelphia at 4th Street and Cherry Street, serving as an upper school for the Quaker primary schools with grades 7 through 12. In 1857, the school moved to 15th and Race Street, remaining at this location until 1925, when it moved to its current campus on City Avenue (formerly the Wistar Morris Estate). The main house of the estate, constructed in 1862, remains and serves as the administrative building of the school and an architectural focal point of the campus. In 1988, due to the growth of the student body, Friends' Central acquired the Montgomery School's property and relocated the lower school there. Recent expansion includes the construction of the Shimada Athletic Center (2000) and the Fannie Cox Center for Science, Math, and Technology (2003).  In 2011, David Felsen retired after 23 years of service as headmaster; beginning in the 2012 school year, Craig Sellers was named Head of School. On July 1, 2021, Beth D. Johnson '77 was named Interim Head of School. On February 17, 2022, Beth Johnson was unanimously named the 12th official head of Friends Central.

Curriculumn
Friends' Central School students achieved the highest average SAT scores in all three sections (Math, Verbal, and Writing) of the 19 schools that had scores reported in Suburban Life Magazine's 2010 report on suburban Philadelphia private high schools. The scores were 649 in Math, 669 in Verbal, and 666 in Writing. This report also indicated that Friends' Central had a student-faculty ratio of 9:1, yearly high school tuition of $25,400 and that 100% of the 93 students in the senior class went on to a four-year college.

Quaker values such as community, service, equality, and integrity are all incorporated into student life. All students attend a weekly Meeting for Worship on Wednesdays for 40 minutes, sharing messages when "moved to speak". The community convenes in one room in silence, and individuals stand when expressing thoughts to the community. Students are also required to perform off-campus service for mandatory hours. In the middle and upper school, students must take three courses concerning the history of the Society of Friends and the central philosophies of Quakerism from a non-religious perspective. In middle school, 5th and 7th grades learn the history and faith of Quakerism, and the 9th-grade course further explores the Quaker faith and practice, focusing on a deeper understanding of the religion's history and its testimonies. 11th and 12th graders may take additional study in the origin and philosophy of religion in general.

Athletics
Friends' Central has strong baseball, swimming, girls' track, boys' tennis, basketball, and wrestling programs. From 2009 to 2012, Friends' Central won four consecutive Pennsylvania Independent Schools Boys' Basketball Championships.

Other uses
The Japanese Language School of Philadelphia (JLSP, フィラデルフィア日本語補習授業校 Firaderufia Nihongo Hoshū Jugyō Kō), a supplementary Japanese school, holds its classes at FCS.

Notable alumni

See also
List of Friends Schools

References

External links

Private high schools in Pennsylvania
Quaker schools in Pennsylvania
Lower Merion Township, Pennsylvania
Educational institutions established in 1845
Schools in Montgomery County, Pennsylvania
Private middle schools in Pennsylvania
Private elementary schools in Pennsylvania
1845 establishments in Pennsylvania